Goodenia konigsbergeri is a species of flowering plant in the family Goodeniaceae and is endemic to Southeast Asia. It is a creeping stoloniferous herb with egg-shaped to spatula-shaped leaves and solitary pale yellow and white flowers.

Description
The leaves are slightly fleshy, pale green and have a few scattered teeth on the edges.

Taxonomy and naming
This goodenia was first formally described in 1913 by Cornelis Andries Backer who gave it the name Selliera konigsbergeri in the Bulletin du Jardin botanique de Buitenzorg. In 1916, Isaäc Boldingh changed the name to Goodenia konigsbergeri in Zakflora voor der Landouwstreken op Java.

Distribution and habitat

References

konigsbergeri
Flora of Southeast Asia
Plants described in 1913